Lothar John was a former Grand Prix motorcycle road racer from Germany. His best year was in 1969, when he finished ninth in the 250cc world championship.

References 

Year of birth missing
German motorcycle racers
125cc World Championship riders
250cc World Championship riders
350cc World Championship riders
500cc World Championship riders
Place of birth missing